San Pietro is a Gothic style, Roman Catholic church located on Via Cremonino in Cento, Province of Ferrara, Region of Emilia-Romagna, Italy.

History
Construction of the church began before 1300s, and it was the second oldest parish in Cento. It was attached initially to the Franciscan order. In 1749, it became a parish church, a role for which for some time it shared with the nearby church of San Rocco.

The church underwent numerous refurbishments and contains works by Lucio Massari: 
Crucifixion and Saints; Guercino: Virgin in Glory with Saints Bonaventure, Francis, and donor; and a Madonna and Child, Saints and Guardian Angel.  Due to the 2012 Northern Italy earthquakes, the church was closed for reconstruction. The church once contained a painting depicting a Dead Christ, now in the Pinacoteca di Cento, attributed to Matteo Loves.

References

Roman Catholic churches in Cento
Gothic architecture in Emilia-Romagna
14th-century Roman Catholic church buildings in Italy